Jørgen Frank Rasmussen (21 November 1930 – 10 June 2009) was a Danish cyclist. He competed in the individual and team road race events at the 1952 Summer Olympics.

References

External links
 

1930 births
2009 deaths
Danish male cyclists
Olympic cyclists of Denmark
Cyclists at the 1952 Summer Olympics
People from Rødovre
Sportspeople from the Capital Region of Denmark